The Steigerkopf, also colloquially called the Schänzel, near Edenkoben in the county of  Südliche Weinstraße in the German state of Rhineland-Palatinate, is a mountain, in the Palatine Forest. At the summit, which lies on the territory of Gommersheim, is the Schänzel tower.

Location 

The Steigerkopf lies in the eastern part of the Palatine Forest in the eponymous nature park. Its summit rises about 7 kilometres west-northwest of the small town of Edenkoben on the western rim of a group of mountains that are all over 600 m; 4 kilometres to the northeast is the highest peak in the Palatine Forest, the Kalmit (672.6 m). The summit and those parts of the mountain in the northeast belong to the forest parish of Gommersheim, which form an exclave of this municipality around 17 km to the west of Gommersheim itself. Geologically the  Steigerkopf is a northwestern outlier of the 661.8 m high Kesselberg, whose top is 2 km (as the crow flies) away. The Modenbach, a right tributary of Speyerbach, rises on the southwestern flank of the mountain on which the Gommersheim Forest lies.

History

Schänzel 
Colloquially the Steigerkopf has also been referred to as the Schänzel ("little rampart") since about 4,500 Prussian soldiers built a sconce there in summer 1794. The earthworks were built to delay the 7,000 French Revolutionary troops who had been dispatched to conquer the German territories west of the Rhine. The French were victorious, however, following the decisive and bloody Battle of Trippstadt on 12 and 13 Jul 1794, after a local hunter from the nearby village of Dernbach had guided them into the rear of the Prussian position on the second day. The Prussian commander, General  (1727–1794), was taken prisoner after being severely wounded and died the same day.

Schänzel tower 
In 1874, the Schänzel Tower (Schänzelturm) was built at the summit of the Steigerkopf in memory of the defeated Prussians in recognition of German victory in the 1871 Franco-Prussian War. It is an octagonal observation tower, 13 metres high and made of hewn bunter sandstone. The viewing platform on top of the tower is protected by railings.

The observation tower was dedicated in 1894, a hundred years after the 1794 battle, by the Schänzelturm Society of Edenkoben as follows:

Gallery

References

Further reading 
 

Mountains and hills of Rhineland-Palatinate
Mountains and hills of the Palatinate Forest
Mountains under 1000 metres
Südliche Weinstraße